Custard apple is a common name for a fruit and for the tree that bears it, Annona reticulata.

The tree’s fruits vary in shape; they may be heart-shaped, spherical, oblong or irregular. Their size ranges from 7 to 12 cm (2.8 to 4.7 in), depending on the cultivar. When ripe, the fruit is brown or yellowish, with red highlights and a varying degree of reticulation, depending again on the variety. The flesh varies from juicy and very aromatic to hard with an astringent taste. The flavor is sweet and pleasant, akin to the taste of custard.

The custard apple is native to India, but has also been found to have grown on the island of Timor as early as 1000 CE.

Some similar fruits produced by related trees are also sometimes called custard apples. These include: 
Annonaceae, members of the soursop family.
Asimina triloba, the "pawpaw", a deciduous tree, with a range from southern Ontario to Texas and Florida, that bears the largest edible fruit native to the United States or Canada.
Annona cherimola, a tree and fruit also called cherimoya
Annona squamosa, a tree and fruit also called sugar apple or sweetsop
Annona senegalensis, a tree and fruit called wild custard-apple
Casimiroa edulis, in the rue or citrus family, Rutaceae.

References